The Minnesota Duluth Bulldogs represented the University of Minnesota Duluth in WCHA women's ice hockey during the 2015-16 NCAA Division I women's ice hockey season. It was Maura Crowell's first season as UMD's head coach.

Offseason
July 16: Jessica Healey was named to the Team Canada Development Team, where she competed for a roster spot in the August, 2015 series against the US.

Recruiting

2014–15 Bulldogs

Schedule

|-
!colspan=12 style="background:#AF1E2D;color:#FFC61E;"| Regular Season

|-
!colspan=12 style="background:#AF1E2D;color:#FFC61E;"| WCHA Tournament

Awards and honors
Ashleigh BrykaliukWCHA Second Team All-Star

Maddy RooneyGoaltenderAll-WCHA Rookie Team

References

Minnesota-Duluth
Minnesota Duluth Bulldogs women's ice hockey seasons